Frendraught Castle or House is a 17th-century house, about  east of Huntly, Aberdeenshire, Scotland, and  west of Largue, on the site of a 13th-century castle.

History
The original castle was burnt in 1630; the present house was built in 1656, but remodelled in 1753, and extended in 1790.  It probably incorporates part of the original castle.  The house, which was restored in 1974, is still occupied.

The Crichtons held the property, which James V of Scotland visited in 1535, but it passed to the Morrisons in 1690.

The burning of 1630 was during a feud with the Gordons.  The Lord of Rothiemay, Lord Aboyne, and four others, were killed in the burning, but the Crichton laird and his people escaped.  James Crichton of Frendraught was charged with but acquitted of their murder; but one of his servants, John Meldrum, was executed.  This event was celebrated in the ballad, ‘'The Fire of Frendraught’’, ballad 196 in the Child Ballads.  The Gordons gathered the 'ashes and brynt bones' of the victims and buried them at the Kirk of Gartly.

His son, James Crichton, was created Viscount Frendraught in 1642.  He fought against James Graham, 1st Marquess of Montrose at the battle of Aberdeen, and with him in 1650 at the battle of Carbisdale, where he was wounded and gave his horse to Montrose to allow his escape.  While it is said that he was captured and died soon after, John Buchan says that he lived until 1664 or 1665, and that another story, that he committed suicide after the battle, although accepted by the Dictionary of National Biography, is without foundation.

Structure

 
The present structure has been described as an extended house of considerable complexity and charm. Cellars in the west wing probably belong to the original building, while two small chamfered windows in the west gable seem to be the oldest features.  There are fragments of the adjacent tower, which was demolished in 1947, adhering to the east elevation.

The rebuilding in the 17th century consists of an imposing seven-window harled front with an ashlar-faced three window centre, which is topped by a semicircular pediment, slightly advanced.  The porch, which has a 1688 datestone, was added when the angle tower was embellished with battlements and bartizans, about 1832.  There are crow-stepped offices to the north of the court, which have now been converted; this structure dates from the 18th century or earlier.

Tradition
The ghost of Lady Elizabeth Crichton, who died in the 17th century, who may have been involved in the burning, is said to haunt the castle.  Sightings were reported during the 20th century.

Castles in Great Britain and Ireland
List of castles in Scotland

References

External links

Castles in Aberdeenshire